This is a list of governors of the Brazilian state of Amazonas.

Imperial period
Presidents of the Province

Republic period
Governors of the state of Amazonas

References 

 Encyclopædia Britannica do Brasil, volume 5, São Paulo, 2000.

 
Amazonas
Gov